Hampton is a small Canadian rural community located in southwestern Queens County, Prince Edward Island.

Situated immediately east of Crapaud in the township of Lot 29, Hampton functions as a small highway service centre.

The area was named in 1865 by Mrs. James MacPhail, who came from New Brunswick, possibly Hampton in Kings County. The community had its own post office between 1875 and 1968. It was established as a civic address community in 2000.

Businesses 

 A Kennedy & Co. Ltd.
 Beachside Bed & Breakfast
 Blue Spruces Cottages
 Coastal Escape PEI
 Hampton Haven Cottages
 Hampton Irving Service Station
 Hampton Motel
 Island Sun Cottages
 Island Sun Kennels
 McLure's Cottage By The Sea
 Me & The Missus
 Summer Zephyr
 Redcliffe Beach House

Maps
 Map of Hampton [ Hampton is located between Victoria and Desable]

Communities in Queens County, Prince Edward Island